Yawhen Yawhenavich Kuntsevich ((Yevgeni Kuntsevich); born 16 August 1988) is a Belarusian former professional football player.

Honours
BATE Borisov
Belarusian Premier League champion: 2011, 2012
Belarusian Super Cup winner: 2011

External links

1988 births
Living people
Belarusian footballers
Association football defenders
FC Naftan Novopolotsk players
FC Belshina Bobruisk players
FC BATE Borisov players
FC Granit Mikashevichi players
FC Slavia Mozyr players
FC Torpedo Minsk players
FC Smolevichi players
Sportspeople from Vitebsk